The Hungary women's national 3x3 team is a national basketball team of Hungary, administered by the Hungarian Basketball Federation.

It represents the country in international 3x3 (3 against 3) women's basketball competitions.

Cyesha Goree was the second leading at the 2019 World Cup and led her country to the silver medal.

World Cup record

See also
Hungary men's national 3x3 team
Hungary women's national basketball team

References

Hungary women's national basketball team
Women's national 3x3 basketball teams